Sextus Julius Africanus (c. 160 – c. 240; Greek: Σέξτος Ἰούλιος ὁ Ἀφρικανός or ὁ Λίβυς) was a Christian traveler and historian of the late second and early third centuries. He is important chiefly because of his influence on Eusebius, on all the later writers of Church history among the Church Fathers, and on the whole Greek school of chroniclers.

Biography
The Suda claims Africanus was a "Libyan philosopher", while Gelzer considers him of Roman and Ethiopian descent. Julius called himself a native of Jerusalem – which some scholars consider his birthplace – and lived at the neighbouring Emmaus. His chronicle indicates his familiarity with the topography of historic Judea.

Little of Africanus's life is known and all dates are uncertain. One tradition places him under the Emperor Gordianus III (238–244), others mention him under Severus Alexander (222–235). He appears to have known Abgar VIII (176–213).

Africanus may have served under Septimius Severus against the Osroenians in 195. He went on an embassy to the emperor Severus Alexander to ask for the restoration of Emmaus, which had fallen into ruins. His mission succeeded, and Emmaus was henceforward known as Nicopolis.

Africanus traveled to Greece and Rome and went to Alexandria to study, attracted by the fame of its catechetical school, possibly about the year 215. He knew Greek (in which language he wrote), Latin, and Hebrew. He was at one time a soldier and had been a pagan; he wrote all his works as a Christian.

Whether Africanus was a layman or a cleric remains controversial. Louis-Sébastien Le Nain de Tillemont argued from Africanus's addressing the priest Origen as "dear brother" that Julius must have been a priest himself but Gelzer points out that such an argument is inconclusive.

Writings
Africanus wrote Chronographiai, a history of the world in five volumes. The work covers the period from Creation to the year AD 221. He calculated the period between Creation and Jesus as 5500 years, placing the Incarnation on the first day of AM 5501 (our modern March 25 1 BC). (Note that this dating implies that the birth of Jesus was in December, nine months later.) This method of reckoning led to several Creation eras being used in the Greek Eastern Mediterranean, which all placed Creation within one decade of 5500 BC.

The history, which had an apologetic aim, is no longer extant. But copious extracts from it are to be found in the Chronicon of Eusebius, who used it extensively in compiling the early episcopal lists. There are also fragments in George Syncellus, Cedrenus and the Chronicon Paschale. Eusebius gives some extracts from his letter to one Aristides, reconciling the apparent discrepancy between Matthew and Luke in the genealogy of Christ by a reference to the Jewish law of Levirate marriage, which compelled a man to marry the widow of his deceased brother, if the latter died without issue. His terse and pertinent letter to Origen impugning the authority of the part of the Book of Daniel that tells the story of Susanna, and Origen's lengthy answer, are both extant.

The ascription to Africanus of an encyclopaedic work entitled Kestoi (Κέστοι "Embroidered"), treating of agriculture, natural history, military science, etc., has been disputed on account of its secular and often credulous character. August Neander suggested that it was written by Africanus before he had devoted himself to religious subjects. A fragment of the Kestoi was found in the Oxyrhynchus papyri. According to the New Schaff-Herzog Encyclopedia of Religious Knowledge, the Kestoi "appears to have been intended as a sort of encyclopedia of the material sciences with the cognate mathematical and technical branches, but to have contained a large proportion of merely curious, trifling, or miraculous matters, on which account the authorship of Julius has been questioned. Among the parts published are sections on agriculture, liturgiology, tactics, and medicine (including veterinary practise)."

Verification of Moses
This work does not survive except in fragments, chiefly those preserved by Eusebius and Georgius Syncellus. In turn Africanus preserves fragments of the work of Polemon of Athens' Greek History.

 FRAGMENT 13: From Georgius Syncellus, Chron., Third Book. In Euseb., Præpar., X. 40:
 6. And from Moses, then, to the first Olympiad there are 1020 years, as to the first year of the 55th Olympiad from the same are 1237, in which enumeration the reckoning of the Greeks coincides with us.
 [...] Polemo, for instance, in the first book of his Greek History, says: In the time of Apis, king of Argos, son of Phoroneus, a division of the army of the Egyptians left Egypt, and settled in the Palestine called Syrian, not far from Arabia: these are evidently those who were with Moses.<ref>{{cite book|last1=Grotius|first1=Hugo|author2=John CLARKE (Dean of Salisbury.)|title=The Truth of the Christian Religion ... Corrected and illustrated with notes by Mr. Le Clerc. To which is added, a seventh book, concerning this question, What Christian church we ought to join ourselves to? By the said Mr. Le Clerc. The ninth edition, with additions. Particularly one whole book of Mr. Le Clerc's against indifference of what religion a man is of. Done into English by John Clarke|url=https://books.google.com/books?id=lgheAAAAcAAJ&pg=PA64|year=1809|page=64|quote=Polemon, &c.] He seems to have lived in the Time of Ptolemy Epiphanes; concerning which, see that very useful Book of the famous Gerrard Vossius, of the Greek Historians. Africanus says, the Greek Histories were wrote by him; which is the same Book Athenæus calls, ???. His Words are these: "In the Reign of Apis, king of Argos the Son of Phoroneus, Part of the Egyptian Army went out of Egypt, and dwelt in Syria called Palestine, not far from Arabia. As Africanus preserved the Place of Polemon, so Eusebius in his Chronology preserved that of Africanus.}}</ref>

Notes

References

 395 S. (Texte und Untersuchungen zur Geschichte der altchristlichen Literatur, 165).

Attribution

 Further reading 
 Martin Wallraff (ed.), Iulius Africanus: Chronographiae. The Extant Fragments. In collaboration with Umberto Roberto and Karl Pinggéra, William Adler. Die griechischen christlichen Schriftsteller der ersten Jahrhunderte, NF 15. Translated by W. Adler. Berlin-New York:  Walter de Gruyter, 2007. 
 Wallraff, Martin; Scardino, Carlo; Guignard, Christophe; Mecella, Laura (eds.), Iulius Africanus. Cesti: The Extant Fragments (Die griechischen christlichen Schriftsteller der ersten Jahrhunderte, N.F. 18). Translated by William Adler''. Berlin: Walter de Gruyter, 2012.

External Links 
 

160s births
240s births
3rd-century deaths
2nd-century apocalypticists
2nd-century Christians
2nd-century philosophers
2nd-century Romans
3rd-century apocalypticists
3rd-century Christians
3rd-century historians
3rd-century Romans
3rd-century writers
Christian philosophers
Christian writers
Africanus, Sextus
Libyan philosophers
Greek-language historians from the Roman Empire
Romans from Africa
Writers from Jerusalem